This page lists all described species of the spider family Malkaridae accepted by the World Spider Catalog :

A

Anarchaea

Anarchaea Rix, 2006
 A. corticola (Hickman, 1969) (type) — Australia (Tasmania)
 A. falcata Rix, 2006 — Australia (New South Wales)
 A. raveni Rix, 2006 — Australia (Queensland)
 A. robusta (Rix, 2005) — Australia (Tasmania)

C

Carathea

Carathea Moran, 1986
 C. miyali Moran, 1986 — Australia (Tasmania)
 C. parawea Moran, 1986 (type) — Australia (Tasmania)

Chilenodes

Chilenodes Platnick & Forster, 1987
 C. australis Platnick & Forster, 1987 (type) — Chile, Argentina

F

Flavarchaea

Flavarchaea Rix, 2006
 F. anzac Rix, 2006 — Australia (Queensland)
 F. badja Rix, 2006 — Australia (New South Wales, Australian Capital Territory)
 F. barmah Rix, 2006 — Australia (New South Wales, Victoria)
 F. hickmani (Rix, 2005) — Australia (Tasmania)
 F. humboldti Rix & Harvey, 2010 — New Caledonia
 F. lofty Rix, 2006 — Australia (South Australia)
 F. lulu (Rix, 2005) (type) — Australia (Tasmania)
 F. stirlingensis Rix, 2006 — Australia (Western Australia)

Forstrarchaea

Forstrarchaea Rix, 2006
 F. rubra (Forster, 1949) (type) — New Zealand

M

Malkara

Malkara Davies, 1980
 M. loricata Davies, 1980 (type) — Australia (Queensland)

N

Nanarchaea

Nanarchaea Rix, 2006
 N. binnaburra (Forster, 1955) (type) — Australia (Queensland)
 N. bryophila (Hickman, 1969) — Australia (New South Wales, Victoria, Tasmania)

O

Ozarchaea

Ozarchaea Rix, 2006
 O. bodalla Rix, 2006 — Australia (New South Wales)
 O. bondi Rix, 2006 — Australia (New South Wales)
 O. daviesae Rix, 2006 — Australia (Queensland)
 O. forsteri Rix, 2006 — New Zealand
 O. harveyi Rix, 2006 — Australia (Western Australia)
 O. janineae Rix, 2006 — Australia (New South Wales)
 O. ornata (Hickman, 1969) (type) — Australia (Tasmania)
 O. platnicki Rix, 2006 — Australia (Queensland)
 O. saxicola (Hickman, 1969) — Australia (Tasmania)
 O. spurgeon Rix, 2006 — Australia (Queensland)
 O. stradbroke Rix, 2006 — Australia (Queensland)
 O. valida Rix, 2006 — Australia (New South Wales)
 O. waldockae Rix, 2006 — Australia (Western Australia)
 O. werrikimbe Rix, 2006 — Australia (New South Wales)
 O. westraliensis Rix, 2006 — Australia (Western Australia)
 O. wiangarie Rix, 2006 — Australia (New South Wales)

P

Pararchaea

Pararchaea Forster, 1955
 P. alba Forster, 1955 (type) — New Zealand

Perissopmeros

Perissopmeros Butler, 1932
 P. arkana (Moran, 1986) — Australia (New South Wales)
 P. castaneous Butler, 1932 (type) — Australia (New South Wales)
 P. darwini Rix, Roberts & Harvey, 2009 — Australia (Western Australia)
 P. foraminatus (Butler, 1929) — Australia (Victoria)
 P. grayi (Moran, 1986) — Australia (New South Wales)
 P. mullawerringi (Moran, 1986) — Australia (Capital Territory)
 P. quinguni (Moran, 1986) — Australia (New South Wales)

T

Tingotingo

Tingotingo Hormiga & Scharff, 2020
 T. aho Hormiga & Scharff, 2020 — New Zealand
 T. porotiti Hormiga & Scharff, 2020 (type) — New Zealand
 T. pouaru Hormiga & Scharff, 2020 — New Zealand
 T. tokorera Hormiga & Scharff, 2020 — New Zealand

W

Westrarchaea

Westrarchaea Rix, 2006
 W. pusilla Rix, 2006 — Australia (Western Australia)
 W. sinuosa Rix, 2006 (type) — Australia (Western Australia)
 W. spinosa Rix, 2006 — Australia (Western Australia)

Whakamoke

Whakamoke Hormiga & Scharff, 2020
 W. guacamole Hormiga & Scharff, 2020 — New Zealand
 W. heru Hormiga & Scharff, 2020 — New Zealand
 W. hunahuna Hormiga & Scharff, 2020 — New Zealand
 W. orongorongo Hormiga & Scharff, 2020 (type) — New Zealand
 W. paoka Hormiga & Scharff, 2020 — New Zealand
 W. rakiura Hormiga & Scharff, 2020 — New Zealand
 W. tarakina Hormiga & Scharff, 2020 — New Zealand

References

Malkaridae